
Year 794 (DCCXCIV) was a common year starting on Wednesday (link will display the full calendar) of the Julian calendar. The denomination 794 for this year has been used since the early medieval period, when the Anno Domini calendar era became the prevalent method in Europe for naming years.

Events 
 By place 

 Europe 
 King Charlemagne abandons his channel project (see 793), and attacks the Saxon rebels from the north, supported by a second Frankish army under his son Charles the Younger, which crosses the Rhine at Cologne from the west; threatened from two directions, the Saxons surrender near Paderborn (Westphalia).
 August 10 – Queen Fastrada, third wife of Charlemagne, dies in Frankfurt after 11 years of marriage. Charlemagne consoles himself with Luitgard, an Alemannian noblewoman, whom he marries and moves into his new palace at Aachen (Germany). Luitgard shares Charlemagne's interest in the liberal arts.
 King Louis I (son of Charlemagne), age 16, marries Ermengarde of Hesbaye. She is a Frankish noblewoman and the daughter of Ingerman, count of Hesbaye (modern Belgium).

 Britain 
 May 20 – King Æthelberht II of East Anglia visits the royal Mercian court at Sutton Walls (Herefordshire), with a view to marrying Princess Ælfthryth. He is taken captive and beheaded, on the orders of King Offa.
 Vikings sack the Monkwearmouth–Jarrow Abbey in Northumbria (the second monastery target in England of the Vikings, after the raids on Lindisfarne in 793).

 Asia 
 Kyoto becomes the Japanese capital, ending the Nara period, and beginning the Heian period; a Golden Age of Japanese culture begins that will endure under the domination of the Fujiwara, Minamoto, Tachibana and Taira families, until 1185.

 By topic 

 Communication 
 A paper mill begins production at Baghdad during the Abbasid era, as the Arabs spread the techniques developed by Chinese papermakers. Baghdad becomes a great seat of learning, with Christian and Jewish scholars as well as Muslims, while Europe remains largely unlettered. The Arabs will become the world's most proficient papermakers.

 Religion 
 Council of Frankfurt: King Charlemagne calls for a church meeting of the Frankish realm. Bishops and priests from Francia, Aquitaine, Italy, and Provence are gathered in Franconofurd (modern-day Frankfurt am Main).

Births 
 Arnulf of Sens, Frankish nobleman (or 793)
 Du Cong, chancellor of the Tang Dynasty

Deaths 
 May 20 – Æthelberht II, king of East Anglia
 August 10 – Fastrada, Frankish queen consort (b. 765)
 Solus, Anglo-Saxon missionary and saint (approximate date)

References